Ehsan Tabari (8 February 1917 – 29 April 1989) was an Iranian philosopher, poet and a literary giant who played a major role in modernization in literature and cultural enlightenment in the twentieth century in Iran. He was also instrumental in fostering deep understanding of Marxist philosophy in Iran. A founding member and theoretician of the Tudeh Party of Iran, he was an active participant in advancement in the political process whose aim was social progress and elimination of economic disparity in twentieth-century Iran.

Tabari was born in 1917 in Sari, Mazandaran, Iran. Tabari was fluent in eight languages, and he wrote and translated poetry and did research in linguistics.

He returned to Iran in 1979 after the overthrow of the Shah, but was arrested in 1983 along with other leaders of the Tudeh Party of Iran. In May 1984, after being subjected to barbaric physical and psychological torture in prison, including months of solitary confinement, and without the benefit of being represented by a lawyer, the Islamic Republic of Iran presented a broken man to the world, claiming to have made Tabari "convert to Islam". Disbelief about the sincerity of Tabari's conversion has been fed by the fact that after giving a confessional speech to other political prisoners at Evin prison he was asked by the prison warden "to deny outright the rumor that he had cast himself into the role of a `Galileo.`" Tabari gave not a clear denial but a "long convoluted response", and after his "confession" he remained "not only incarcerated but also in total isolation – even from his own family".

Tabari died on April 29, 1989 of kidney and heart failure, under house arrest in Tehran.

References

Further reading

1917 births
1989 deaths
20th-century Iranian poets
Central Committee of the Tudeh Party of Iran members
Iranian communists
Iranian people convicted of spying for the Soviet Union
Iranian expatriates in East Germany
People granted political asylum in the Soviet Union